Ronald Lynn Moore (born January 26, 1970) is a former professional American football player who was selected by the Phoenix Cardinals in the fourth round of the 1993 NFL Draft. A 5'10", 220-lb. running back from Pittsburg State University and member of Alpha Phi Alpha, Moore played in six National Football League (NFL) seasons, from 1993 to 1998. His best season as a pro came during his rookie season for the Cardinals when he rushed for 1,018 yards and nine touchdowns. He was the winner of the 1992 Harlon Hill Trophy.
In 2021, Moore and his family were contestants on Family Feud.

References

External links
 

1970 births
Living people
American football running backs
Arizona Cardinals players
Miami Dolphins players
New York Jets players
Phoenix Cardinals players
Pittsburg State Gorillas football players
St. Louis Rams players
People from Oklahoma County, Oklahoma
Players of American football from Oklahoma
African-American players of American football
21st-century African-American sportspeople
20th-century African-American sportspeople
Ed Block Courage Award recipients